The Passion was a three-episode 1999 British TV series written by Mick Ford. It was set in, and filmed in, North Devon, and related events set around a local amateur production of a passion play.

External links

1999 British television series debuts
1999 British television series endings